Tharuwan is also the homeland of Tharu people in Terai region of Nepal.  It comprises the 11 southwestern Terai districts of Nepal. Tharuhat was proposed Tharu ethnic state by the Tharuhat Tarai Party Nepal.  Deadly clashes have broken out between Tharu protestors with government forces repeatedly over demands.

See also
List of provinces of Nepal
People's Freedom Party
Nepal Loktantrik Forum
List of districts of Nepal
 Limbuwan
 Terai
 Tamuwan

References

Lumbini Province
History of Nepal
Proposed states of Nepal